Scopula conotaria is a moth of the family Geometridae. It was described by Schaus in  1901. It is found in south-eastern Brazil.

References

Moths described in 1901
Moths of South America
conotaria
Taxa named by William Schaus